Pietro Rosano (Naples, 25 December 1846 – Naples, 9 November 1903) was an Italian politician and lawyer.

Biography 
A supporter of Giovanni Giolitti, the statesman of Mondovì, Rosano was a member of Parliament representing the constituency of Aversa almost continuously from October 1882 to 1903, undersecretary at the Ministry of the Interior (1892–93) and Minister of Finance of the Kingdom of Italy in the Giolitti II Cabinet.

He was a prominent criminal lawyer whose penetrating and fascinating legal and oratorical style found success in all the courts of Italy and in the most difficult trials. Husband to the sister-in-law of the lawyer and philanthropist Gaspare Colosimo, he was a pupil of Nicola Amore, the lawyer and mayor of Naples.

Shortly after the second Giolitti government gained confidence in the Chamber of Deputies, members of the Italian Socialist Party, the Italian Republican Party and the Italian Radical Party launched a campaign of personal attacks against him. Rosano, unaccustomed to such bitter political clashes and experiencing serious family problems, proclaimed his innocence by shooting himself in the heart at his home in Naples, only six days after taking office as Minister of Finance.

The city of Aversa named a street after him and erected a marble monument in the Villa Comunale.

Personal life 
Some biographies erroneously state that Pietro Rosano was born in Aversa. He was born in Naples on 25 December 1846 in via Ventaglieri 12. He was born to Giuseppe Rosano, originally from Caivano, and Marianna Vinci.

Together with Giovanni Battista Cassinis, keeper of the seals from Piedmont, Rosano was the second minister who committed suicide in office since the foundation of the Kingdom of Italy.

References 

1846 births
1903 deaths
1903 suicides
Deputies of Legislature XV of the Kingdom of Italy
Deputies of Legislature XVI of the Kingdom of Italy
Deputies of Legislature XVII of the Kingdom of Italy
Deputies of Legislature XVIII of the Kingdom of Italy
Deputies of Legislature XIX of the Kingdom of Italy
Deputies of Legislature XX of the Kingdom of Italy
Deputies of Legislature XXI of the Kingdom of Italy
Finance ministers of Italy
19th-century Italian lawyers
20th-century Italian lawyers
19th-century Italian politicians
20th-century Italian politicians
Politicians from Naples
Suicides by firearm in Italy